The 2021 World Sambo Championships is an edition of the World Sambo Championships, organised by the International Sambo Federation. It was held in Tashkent, Uzbekistan from 12 to 14 November 2021.

Medal summary

Men's events

Source Results

Women's events

Source Results

Combat Sambo Events

Source Results

Medal table

References

External links
 

World Sambo Championships
World Championships
Sambo
Sambo in Uzbekistan
Sambo
Sambo, World Championships